Géraud Sénizergues (born 9 March 1957) is a French computer scientist at the University of Bordeaux.

He is known for his contributions to automata theory, combinatorial group theory and abstract rewriting systems.

He received his Ph.D. (Doctorat d'état en Informatique) from the Université Paris Diderot (Paris 7) in 1987 under the direction of Jean-Michel Autebert.

With Yuri Matiyasevich he obtained results about the Post correspondence problem. He won the 2002 Gödel Prize "for proving that equivalence of deterministic pushdown automata is decidable". In 2003 he was awarded with the Gay-Lussac Humboldt Prize.

References

External links
Homepage

Living people
French computer scientists
Academic staff of the University of Bordeaux
Gödel Prize laureates
1957 births